Dry Martini is a 1928 film comedy produced and distributed by Fox Film Corporation starring Mary Astor and Matt Moore. The Movietone sound system was used for music and sound effects but otherwise it is a silent film. A silent version was also made. Samuel L. Rothafel also contributed music for the film. It was adapted from the 1926 novel Dry Martini: a Gentleman Turns to Love by John Thomas. Ray Flynn was an assistant director.

This film is lost.

Plot

Wealthy divorced American Willoughby Quimby has been living in Paris, France for ten years when he learns his adult daughter Elizabeth is coming to visit. He has been living the high life full of wine and women but decides to forego both during her stay. Elizabeth gets bored with him so she begins seeing rakish artist Paul De Launay. Quimby's young pal Freddie Fletcher saves Elizabeth from the clutches of de Launay in the nick of time. After Elizabeth's marriage to Freddie her father returns to his wanton ways.

Cast

 Mary Astor – Elizabeth Quimby
 Matt Moore – Freddie Fletcher
 Sally Eilers – Lucille Grosvenor
 Albert Gran – Willoughby Quimby
 Albert Conti – Paul De Launay
 Tom Ricketts – Joseph
 Hugh Trevor – Bobbie Duncan
 John Webb Dillon – Frank
 Marcelle Corday – Mrs. Koenig

References

External links

MRQE plot summary for Dry Martini
AllMovie.com
Moviessilently.com, May 6, 2013

1928 films
American silent feature films
Fox Film films
American films based on plays
Films set in Paris
1928 comedy films
Silent American comedy films
American black-and-white films
Lost American films
1928 lost films
Lost comedy films
1920s English-language films
Films directed by Harry d'Abbadie d'Arrast
1920s American films